Unió Esportiva Sants is a football team based in Barcelona. Founded in 1922, it plays in Tercera División RFEF – Group 5. Its stadium is Camp de futbol de l’Energia, with a capacity of 1,000.

History
F.C. Internacional de Barcelona and C.E. Sants merged in UE Sants. It happened on 26 April 1922, and Josep Roig Chovar became the club's first president.

Club names
Unió Esportiva Sants - (1922–1939; 1975–)
Unión Deportiva Sans - (1939–1975)

Season to season

31 seasons in Tercera División
1 season in Tercera División RFEF

References

External links
 Official website

 
Football clubs in Catalonia
Football clubs in Barcelona
Association football clubs established in 1922
Divisiones Regionales de Fútbol clubs
1922 establishments in Spain